Picton may refer to:

Places
Picton Castle, in Pembrokeshire, Wales, UK
Picton, Cheshire, England, UK
Picton (ward), an electoral ward of the Liverpool City Council, England, UK
Picton, New South Wales, Australia
Picton, Western Australia, an industrial suburb of Bunbury, Western Australia
Picton, Ontario, Canada
CFB Picton, a former military installation
Picton, Lennox and Nueva, islands off Tierra del Fuego, Chile
Picton, New Zealand
Picton (New Zealand electorate)
Picton, North Yorkshire, England, UK
Picton River, a river that joins the Huon River in Tasmania

People
 Cesar Picton (c. 1755 – 1836), from slave to successful businessman in England
 James Picton (1805–1889), Liverpool architect
 James Allanson Picton (1832–1910), British author, philosopher and politician
 Thomas Picton (1758–1815), Welsh general who led British forces in the Peninsular War
 Chris Picton (born 1983), an Australian politician

Other uses
Picton (1815 ship), a full-rigged ship, wrecked 1820
SS Picton, involved in the Halifax Explosion (1917)
Picton (racehorse), a competitor that failed to complete the 1848 Grand National

See also

Pickton (disambiguation)